The 2021–22 season was the 142nd season of competitive football by Rangers.

Rangers played a total of 65 competitive matches during the 2021–22 season, reaching the Europa League Final and winning the Scottish Cup.

Players

Squad information

Transfers

In

First team

Academy

Out

First team

Academy

New contracts

First team

Academy

Pre-season and friendlies

Competitions

Overall

Scottish Premiership

League table

Results by round

Matches

Scottish Cup

Scottish League Cup

UEFA Champions League

Third qualifying round

UEFA Europa League

Play-off round

Group stage

Knockout round-play-offs

Round of 16

Quarter-finals

Semi-finals

Final

Squad statistics
The table below includes all players registered with the SPFL as part of the Rangers squad for 2021–22 season. They may not have made an appearance.

Appearances and goals
{| class="wikitable sortable" style="text-align:center"
|-
!rowspan="2" style="background:#00f; color:white;" |No.
!rowspan="2" style="background:#00f; color:white;" |Pos.
!rowspan="2" style="background:#00f; color:white;" |Nat.
!rowspan="2" style="background:#00f; color:white;" |Name
!colspan="2" style="background:#00f; color:white;" |Totals
!colspan="2" style="background:#00f; color:white;" |Scottish Premiership
!colspan="2" style="background:#00f; color:white;" |Scottish Cup
!colspan="2" style="background:#00f; color:white;" |League Cup
!colspan="2" style="background:#00f; color:white;" |Champions League
!colspan="2" style="background:#00f; color:white;" |Europa League
|-
!Apps
!Goals
!Apps
!Goals
!Apps
!Goals
!Apps
!Goals
!Apps
!Goals
!Apps
!Goals
|-
! colspan=16 style=background:#dcdcdc; text-align:center| Goalkeepers
|-

|-
! colspan=16 style=background:#dcdcdc; text-align:center| Defenders
|-

|-
! colspan=16 style=background:#dcdcdc; text-align:center| Midfielders
|-

|-
! colspan=16 style=background:#dcdcdc; text-align:center| Forwards
|-

|-
! colspan=16 style=background:#dcdcdc; text-align:center| Players transferred or loaned out during the season who made an appearance

|-
 Appearances (starts and substitute appearances) and goals include those in Scottish Premiership, League Cup, Scottish Cup, the UEFA Champions League and the UEFA Europa League.

Discipline

Yellow cards

Red cards

Clean sheets

Footnotes

Notes

References

Rangers F.C. seasons
Rangers
Rangers
2021–22 UEFA Champions League participants seasons